Church of Nativity of The Most Holy Theotokos is a Serbian Orthodox church in the village of Novaci, Serbia. It was built in 1857 and is dedicated to the Nativity of The Most Holy Theotokos (Virgin Mary).

Feast day
The feast day of the church and the whole village of Novaci is the day of the nativity of the Virgin Mary, September 21 (Gregorian calendar) or September 8 (Julian calendar). That holiday is named Mala Gospojina ("Little Day of Our Lady").

Frescos
The church was painted in 1937 by the famous Russian painter Andrej Bicenko. Bicenko had escaped from Russia after the October Revolution, and lived in Serbia from 1920 to 1951,during which time he painted many frescos. A particularly interesting fresco in this church is Lord of Sabbath, which shows Jesus and his disciples walking through grain fields on the Sabbath day.

See also
Novaci (Ub)
 Churches in Serbia
Andrej Bicenko

External links
 Serbian Orthodox Church 
Namesnistvo Tamnavsko 

Serbian Orthodox church buildings in Serbia
Churches completed in 1857
19th-century Serbian Orthodox church buildings
1857 establishments in Serbia